Gili Raanan (born 1969) is an Israeli venture capitalist and one of the inventors of CAPTCHA (US patent application with 1997 priority date ), the WAF (web application firewall) and many other inventions in the fields of application security and discovery. Raanan started Sanctum in 1997, and invented the first Web application firewall AppShield and the first Web application penetration testing software AppScan. He later started NLayers which was acquired by EMC Corporation pioneering the science of Application discovery and understanding. He is an investor and a General Partner at Sequoia Capital, the Founder of Cyberstarts, and was a board member at Adallom, Armis Security, Onavo, Moovit, Innovid  (NYSE:CTV) and Snaptu.

Biography 
Gili Raanan was born in Kfar Saba, Israel. He earned a Bachelor of Computer Science In 2002 from the Tel Aviv University, he received a Master of Business Administration degree from the Recanati School of the Tel Aviv University.

Business career
Raanan started Sanctum in 1997, and invented the first Web application firewall AppShield and the first Web application penetration testing software AppScan.

As part of the research on Application Security Raanan co-invented CAPTCHA, as described in the patent application "The invention is based on applying human advantage in applying sensory and cognitive skills to solving simple problems that prove to be extremely hard for computer software. Such skills include, but are not limited to, processing of sensory information such as identification of objects and letters within a noisy graphical environment".

Raanan later started NLayers in 2003 which was acquired by EMC Corporation pioneering the science of Application discovery and understanding.

Venture capitalist
In 2009 Raanan joined Sequoia Capital in Israel as a General Partner. Raanan was a board member at Adallom, Onavo and Snaptu. In 2018 Raanan founded Cyberstarts, which is an early stage VC focused on Cybersecurity. Raanan is a seed investor in a number of fast-growing Cybersecurity companies such as Fireblocks, Wiz, Noname, Island.io, Armis and Adallom.

Philanthropy
In 2010 Raanan was one of the early contributors to SpaceIL's Beresheet, Israel’s privately funded, engineered and launched mission to the Moon’s surface.

References

Living people
1969 births
Israeli inventors
Israel Defense Prize recipients